"Lost" is a song by English singer Cher Lloyd from her upcoming third studio album. It was released on 24 April 2020 under Universal Music Group as the second single from the album. An accompanying video directed by Raja Virdi was released on April 24. Writing for The Guardian, Leonie Cooper said: "There is something heartening about this largely harmless return."

Background and production
After releasing her album Sorry I'm Late in 2014, Lloyd went on a musical hiatus before releasing several songs between 2016 and 2019. After signing a new record deal with Polydor Records & Universal Music Germany, she released "None of My Business" in 2018 and "M.I.A" in 2019, both in October. Several months later, Lloyd began teasing "Lost" for a week before being released in April.

The song was written by Raphaella, Casey Smith, Patrick Jordan-Patrikios, Boy Matthews, Youthonix & Cher Lloyd while it was mixed and mastered by Lex Barkey. Hitimpulse produced the song and have been consistent producers for Lloyd since the aforementioned singles.

Critical reception
Mike Wass of Idolator called the song a "cute bop" stating "Cher Lloyd returns with a fiery kiss-off anthem called 'Lost,' which is the musical equivalent of posturing on social media so your ex can see how amazing your life is." While Pip Williams writing for The Line of Best Fit stated "'Lost' is far and away the strongest release of Lloyd's career to date, blowing those who still reference 'Swagger Jagger' as a career high out of the water. The new cut sees Lloyd embrace languid balladry as a vehicle for a surprisingly hard-hitting lyric. It's still slickly produced and radio-friendly, but there's a heart and soul to it that many mainstream stars would struggle to match."

Music video
The official video to the single premiered on YouTube the day of release. The video was shot in a single take with no cuts or edits made, depicting Lloyd on a bed with neon and pastel lights changing behind her as she sings. Cher wore a pearl-studded corset with a blue puffy sheer robe to match. She can also be seen wearing a three-row Swarovski pearl Vivienne Westwood choker. Lloyd commented in an Instagram Livestream that the lighting was the most difficult aspect of filming the video. The video was produced by Phase Films and directed by Raja Virdi who worked on her previous single "M.I.A".

Track listing 
Digital download / streaming
 "Lost" - 2:55

Digital download / streaming ("One Drink Away" Spotify B Side)
 "One Drink Away" - 2:25
 "Lost" - 2:55

Personnel
Credits adapted from YouTube Music.
 Cher Lloyd – vocals, songwriting
 Hitimpulse – production
 Raphaella Mazaheri-Asadi – songwriting
 Hanni Ibrahim – songwriting
 Patrick Jordan-Patrikios – songwriting
 Casey Smith – songwriting
 Boy Matthews – songwriting
 Lex Barkey – studio personnel, mixing, mastering

Charts

Release history

References

2020 songs
2020 singles
Cher Lloyd songs